The 2nd Parliament of Upper Canada was opened 1 June 1797.  Elections in Upper Canada had been held in August 1796. The first session was held at Navy Hall in Newark.  The Lieutenant-Governor of Upper Canada John Graves Simcoe believed York was a superior location for the capital as it would less vulnerable to attack by the Americans.  York became the capital of Upper Canada on 1 February 1796.  The remaining three sessions were held at the Parliament Buildings of Upper Canada in York, Upper Canada.  This parliament was dissolved 7 July 1800.

This House of Assembly of the 2nd Parliament of Upper Canada had four sessions 3 June 1797 to 4 July 1800:

See also
Legislative Council of Upper Canada
Executive Council of Upper Canada
Legislative Assembly of Upper Canada
Lieutenant Governors of Upper Canada, 1791–1841
Historical federal electoral districts of Canada
List of Ontario provincial electoral districts

References

Further reading
Handbook of Upper Canadian Chronology, Frederick H. Armstrong, Toronto : Dundurn Press, 1985. 

02
1797 establishments in Upper Canada
1800 disestablishments in Upper Canada